Downtown Wayne Historic District is a national historic district located at Radnor Township, Delaware County, Pennsylvania.  The district includes approximately 100 resources.

It was added to the National Register of Historic Places in 2012.

References

Historic districts on the National Register of Historic Places in Pennsylvania
Historic districts in Delaware County, Pennsylvania
National Register of Historic Places in Delaware County, Pennsylvania
Radnor Township, Delaware County, Pennsylvania